Aborolabis mordax is a species of earwig in the genus Aborolabis, the family Anisolabididae, the suborder Forficulina, and the order Dermaptera. Found primarily in the Palearctic realm, this species was first classified by Henrik Steinmann in 1978.

References 

Anisolabididae
Insects described in 1978